Francesca "Fran" Kirby (born 29 June 1993) is an English professional footballer who plays as an attacking midfielder for Chelsea and the England national team. She began her career with hometown club Reading before moving to Chelsea in July 2015. In August 2014, Kirby won her first senior cap for England. She represented her country at the 2015 FIFA Women's World Cup in Canada, the 2019 FIFA Women's World Cup in France and the UEFA Women's Euro 2017 in the Netherlands.

In April 2018, Kirby was awarded the PFA Women's Players' Player of the Year and the Football Writers' Women's Footballer of the Year. She was named to the shortlist for the Ballon d'Or in 2021, ranking 10th. She was also named to the Top 10 of The Guardian The 100 Best Female Footballers In The World in 2021, ranking 7th.

As of December 2020, she is Chelsea's all-time top scorer.

Early life

Born and raised in Reading with her brother Jamie and parents Denise and Steve, Kirby began playing football as a young girl after watching her brother play. She would play any chance she got: at school, in the street, in the front garden. At a young age, her mother, Denise, wrote in a birthday card that Fran would play in a World Cup one day: she was her biggest supporter. When Fran was 14, her mother died suddenly from a brain haemorrhage. Two years later, she experienced a deep depression.

Kirby attended Caversham Park Primary School and Chiltern Edge, Sonning Common where she played against boys. At age 7, she joined Reading's academy and made her senior debut at 16.

Club career

Reading, 2012–15
Kirby joined her hometown club Reading at the age of seven and worked her way through the youth teams. She made her debut for the first team at the age of sixteen but quit football the following year after an onset of depression, brought about by the death of her mother. Kirby returned to the club in 2012 and went on to become the FA Women's Premier League Southern Division's top scorer for the 2012–13 season, with 32 goals in 21 appearances.

With Reading promoted to the newly formed Women's Super League 2 for 2014, Kirby helped the team achieve third place with 24 goals in sixteen appearances. She ended the season as the league's top goalscorer; netting four against London Bees, as well as hat-tricks against Durham, Watford and Doncaster Rovers Belles. Shortly after, she became the first female player to receive a professional contract from the club. At the 2014 FA Women's Awards, Kirby was named the inaugural WSL2 Players' Player of the Year.

Kirby continued her goalscoring form into the 2015 WSL2 season, taking 11 goals in five league appearances for Reading, including all four goals in a 4–2 away win against Yeovil Town and five goals in a 7–0 win against London Bees. Following the 2015 FIFA Women's World Cup, Reading accepted an undisclosed transfer fee from Chelsea and she completed a move in July 2015. It was reported that the fee of between £40,000 and £60,000 constituted a British record, although Chelsea denied this was the case and Kirby was not aware of the figure.

Chelsea, 2015 – Present
At the 2015 FA Women's Cup Final, staged at Wembley Stadium for the first time, Kirby was a cup-tied spectator for Chelsea's 1–0 win over Notts County. It was Chelsea's first major trophy. In October 2015, she scored twice in Chelsea's 4–0 win over Sunderland which secured the club's first FA WSL title; a league and cup double. The same month, Kirby scored Chelsea's first ever UEFA Women's Champions League goal in a 1–0 win over Glasgow City.

Kirby's form extended into the 2016 FA WSL season. In April, she secured Chelsea's return to Wembley Stadium by scoring a late, extra-time winner against Manchester City in the FA Women's Cup semi-final. Four days later, she scored both goals in Chelsea's 2–0 WSL win at Arsenal.

On 22 April 2018, Kirby was awarded the PFA Women's Players' Player of the Year and the Football Writers' Women's Footballer of the Year for the 2017–18 season.

In February 2020, Chelsea announced that Kirby was diagnosed with pericarditis, which had ruled her out of the team since November 2019. She overcame her infection, despite being told by cardiologists that she may never play again, and played 70 minutes in Chelsea's FA Community Shield win against Manchester City on 29 August 2020. On 9 December 2020, Kirby's 2 goals in a 5–0 win against Benfica in the UEFA Women's Champions League, saw her overtake Eniola Aluko as Chelsea's all-time goal scorer, with her 69th and 70th goals for the club, five years after signing.

During a match against her former club, Reading on 10 January 2021, Kirby scored four goals lifting Chelsea to a 5–0 win. In the 2021 FA Women's League Cup final match against Bristol City W.F.C., Kirby scored two goals and created four assists as defending champions Chelsea won 6–0 at Vicarage Road.

Kirby was singled out by observers as the top performer for Chelsea during their double-winning 2020–21 campaign. She later won FWA's 2021 Women's Footballer of the Year award. On 5 December, Kirby scored the opening goal in the delayed 2020–21 FA Cup final against Arsenal, helping her team lift the trophy and secure the domestic quadruple of the 2020–21 season, the first English women's club to achieve the feat.

International career

Early in her career, Kirby was a member of the England under-23 squad. She became the first WSL 2 player to be called up to the senior squad, in June 2014 for the World Cup qualifiers against Belarus and Ukraine. She was named on the substitutes' bench against Belarus but did not make an appearance. She made her senior international debut against Sweden in August 2014, getting the second goal in a 4–0 friendly win at Victoria Park, Hartlepool.

In May 2015, England manager Mark Sampson named Kirby in his final squad for the 2015 FIFA Women's World Cup, hosted in Canada. She scored in England's 2–1 win over Mexico and was hailed "mini Messi" by Sampson. Although Kirby was disappointed to be ruled out by injury from the quarter-finals onwards, England's eventual third-place finish left her with a positive overall impression of the tournament: "a fantastic experience and one I won't forget in a hurry."

Sampson kept Kirby in the national team for the UEFA Women's Euro 2017 qualifying campaign. In Estonia on 21 September 2015 she scored twice in England's 8–0 win. After "12 months of hell" caused by knee and ankle injuries, Kirby returned to England's line-up for UEFA Women's Euro 2017 in the Netherlands. In England's opening fixture against rivals Scotland, second striker Kirby's clever dummy sent Jodie Taylor through to score England's opening goal in a 6–0 rout. In the next match Kirby and Taylor scored in a 2–0 win over Spain, which secured England's place in the quarter-final. When England were thrashed 3–0 by the hosts in the semi-final, Kirby was rueful: "We had chances and could have had a few penalties. We are bitterly disappointed".

On 6 October 2018, Kirby scored in England's 1–0 friendly win over Brazil at Meadow Lane. In post-match interviews England coach Phil Neville breathlessly proclaimed Kirby's superiority to six-time World Player of the Year Marta: "I'd take my No 10 over Brazil's No 10, that's for sure".

In June 2022 Kirby was included in the England squad which won the UEFA Women's Euro 2022.

Great Britain
Kirby was hailed as a "stand out player" in Great Britain's gold medal-winning team at the 2013 Summer Universiade in Kazan, Russia. She went on to represent Great Britain at the delayed 2020 Tokyo Olympics.

Personal life 
While growing up, Kirby was very close to her mother Denise. At the age of 14, her mother passed away due to a brain haemorrhage. "I just could not comprehend what had happened. And it stayed like that for many years." Away with England U17, she broke down because she "missed [her] mum". She returned home and dropped out of football. After her mother's death, she fell into a depression. "I'd have days where I wouldn't get out of bed. Or I wouldn't go to college. I could get as far as the bus stop, then I'd just break down crying." One day, one of her friends invited her to play with her amateur team, where she found her love for football again. Kirby says that her mother is still very important in her life. "Towards the end of the season where everything was great, ... I remember sitting on the coach back from the last game of the season and I just cried. ... I remember sitting next to the girls and I just said 'there's only one person  who I wanna pick up the phone to and call, and I can't do that'." "I think about her every day, but especially when things are going well, because I want to celebrate with her."

In October 2019, Kirby received the honorary degree of Doctor of Science (D.Sc.) from the University of Winchester for her "achievements both on and off the field, in particular her work supporting mental health and wellbeing."

In February 2020, Chelsea revealed Kirby had successfully recovered from pericarditis, a potential career ending illness. Kirby had fallen ill in November 2019 and came close to retiring from the game as a result.

In April 2020, Kirby was named in Diva magazine's '"Visible Lesbian 100" list during Lesbian Visibility Week.

In April 2022, Kirby revealed on Twitter that she had continued to succumb to an "on-going issue" throughout her career and wanted to "put [her] health first". Emma Hayes, the manager of Chelsea Women, clarified during a press conference that Kirby had been "suffering a lot with fatigue", yet the cause for this is currently unknown.

Career statistics

Club

International
Statistics accurate as of match played 26 July 2022.

Scores and results list England's goal tally first, score column indicates score after each Kirby goal.

Honours
Chelsea
 FA Women's Super League: 2015, Spring Series, 2017–18, 2019–20, 2020–21, 2021–22
 FA Women's Cup: 2014–15, 2017–18, 2020–21, 2021–22
 FA Women's League Cup: 2019–20, 2020–21
 FA Women's Community Shield: 2020
 UEFA Women's Champion's League runners-up: 2020–21

England

FIFA Women's World Cup: third place 2015
UEFA Women's Championship: 2022

Individual
 PFA Women's Players' Player of the Year: 2017–18, 2020–21
 PFA WSL 1 Team of the Year: 2017–18, 2020–21
 FWA Women's Footballer of the Year: 2017–18, 2020–21
FA Women's Super League Player of the Month: January 2021, September 2021
London Football Awards Women's Super League Player of the Year: 2020–21
FA Women's Super League Player of the Year: 2020–21
Chelsea Women's Player of the Year: 2017–18, 2020–2021
Freedom of the City of London (announced 1 August 2022)

Records
 All-time leading scorer for Chelsea Women: 101

See also

 List of UEFA Women's Championship goalscorers
 List of England women's international footballers
 List of FA WSL hat-tricks
 List of Nike sponsorships
 List of people from Reading, Berkshire

References

Further reading
 Aluko, Eniola (2019), They Don't Teach This, Random House, 
 Brown, Charlotte (2019), Kirby, John Blake 
 Caudwell, Jayne (2013), Women's Football in the UK: Continuing with Gender Analyses, Taylor & Francis, 
 Clarke, Gemma (2019), Soccerwomen: The Icons, Rebels, Stars, and Trailblazers Who Transformed the Beautiful Game, 
 Dunn, Carrie (2019), Pride of the Lionesses: The Changing Face of Women's Football in England, Pitch Publishing (Brighton) Limited, 
 Dunn, Carrie (2016), The Roar of the Lionesses: Women's Football in England, Pitch Publishing Limited, 
 Grainey, Timothy (2012), Beyond Bend It Like Beckham: The Global Phenomenon of Women's Soccer, University of Nebraska Press, 
 Smith, Kelly (2012), Footballer: My Story, Transworld, 
 Stay, Shane (2019), The Women's World Cup 2019 Book: Everything You Need to Know About the Soccer World Cup, Books on Demand, 
 Theivam, Keiran and Jeff Kassouf (2019), The Making of the Women's World Cup: Defining Stories from a Sport's Coming of Age, Little,

External links

Football Association player profile
Chelsea FC player profile

1993 births
Living people
Women's association football forwards
English women's footballers
England women's under-23 international footballers
England women's international footballers
Chelsea F.C. Women players
Women's Super League players
Sportspeople from Reading, Berkshire
Reading F.C. Women players
2015 FIFA Women's World Cup players
2019 FIFA Women's World Cup players
Footballers at the 2020 Summer Olympics
Universiade gold medalists for Great Britain
Universiade medalists in football
Medalists at the 2013 Summer Universiade
Lesbian sportswomen
LGBT association football players
English LGBT sportspeople
Olympic footballers of Great Britain
Footballers from Berkshire
UEFA Women's Euro 2022 players
UEFA Women's Championship-winning players
UEFA Women's Euro 2017 players